This is a list of nicknames of prime ministers of Italy. Many prime ministers have had a nickname which was in common usage at the time they were in office. Many nicknames can be perceived as disparaging although others are complimentary or affectionate.

List of nicknames

Camillo Benso di Cavour
Full name: Camillo Benso, Count of Cavour
The Great Weaver

Bettino Ricasoli
Full name: Bettino Ricasoli
Iron Baron (Barone di Ferro)

Alfonso Ferrero La Marmora
Full name: Alfonso Ferrero La Marmora
Bomber of the People (Cannoneggiatore del Popolo)

Agostino Depretis
Full name: Agostino Depretis
Janus Bifrons (Giano Bifronte)
Chameleon (Camaleonte)

Francesco Crispi
Full name: Francesco Crispi
The Loner (Il Solitario)

Giovanni Giolitti
Full name: Giovanni Giolitti
Minister of Underworld (Ministro della Malavita)
 The Man of Dronero (L'Uomo di Dronero)

Vittorio Emanuele Orlando
Full name: Vittorio Emanuele Orlando
The President of Victory (Il Presidente della Vittoria)

Benito Mussolini
Full name: Benito Amilcare Andrea Mussolini
Bald Head (in Lombard language)
The Jaw (Il Mascella)
 He (Lui)
 The Stinker (in Romanesco dialect)

Alcide De Gasperi
Full name: Alcide De Gasperi
 Cold polenta (Polenta fredda)

Amintore Fanfani
Full name: Amintore Fanfani
 Purebred Horse (Cavallo di Razza)
 Pony
 There he is again (Rieccolo)

Mario Scelba
Full name: Mario Scelba
 Iron Sicilian (Siciliano di Ferro)

Aldo Moro
Full name: Aldo Moro
 Doctor Divago – A pun about Doctor Zhivago.
 Purebred Horse

Mariano Rumor
Full name: Mariano Rumor
 Pious Mariano (Pio Mariano)

Giulio Andreotti
Full name: Giulio Andreotti
 Divus Julius (Divo Giulio)
 The Hunchback (Il Gobbo)
 Beelzebub (Belzebù)
 Uncle Giulio (Zio Giulio)
 The Sphinx (La Sfinge)
 The Black Pope (Il Papa Nero)
 The Fox (La Volpe)
 Moloch

Francesco Cossiga
Fulle name: Francesco Cossiga
 Koiga
 The Pickaxe-wielder (Il Picconatore)

Arnaldo Forlani
Full name: Arnaldo Forlani
 Evil Rabbit (Coniglio Mannaro)
 The Firefighter (Il Pompiere)

Bettino Craxi
Full name: Benedetto Craxi
 The Big Boar (Il Cinghialone)

Giuliano Amato
Full name: Giuliano Amato
 Doctor Subtilis (Dottor Sottile)

Silvio Berlusconi
Full name: Silvio Berlusconi
 The Knight
 The Caiman
 Daddy
 The Dwarf
 
 B.

Lamberto Dini
Full name: Lamberto Dini
 The Toad (Il Rospo)

Romano Prodi
Full name: Romano Prodi
 The Professor (Il Professore)
 Mortadella

Massimo D'Alema
Full name: Massimo D'Alema
 Little moustache (Baffino)
 Leader Maximo

Mario Monti
Full name: Mario Monti
 Rigor Montis

Matteo Renzi
Full name: Matteo Renzi
 The Scrapper (Il Rottamatore)
 The Bomb (Il Bomba)
 Renzie
 Renzusconi

Paolo Gentiloni
Full name: Paolo Gentiloni Silveri
 Paolo The Calm (Paolo il Calmo)
 The Slow-mover (Er moviola)
 The Un-populist (L'impopulista)

Giuseppe Conte
Full name: Giuseppe Conte
 The Lawyer of the People (L'avvocato del popolo)
 Giuseppi

Mario Draghi
Full name: Mario Draghi
 Super Mario

References

Italy